Alangudi is a village in the Mayiladuthurai taluk of Mayiladuthurai district, Tamil Nadu, India.

Demographics 

 census, Alangudi had a total population of 1892 with 974 males and 918 females. The sex ratio was 943. The literacy rate was 73.37%.

References 
 

Villages in Mayiladuthurai district